Vít Kaňkovský (born 5 February 1970) is a Czech politician and physician. He is a member of the Chamber of Deputies for the Christian and Democratic Union – Czechoslovak People's Party (KDU-ČSL) since October 2013, Deputy of the Vysočina Region and logterm Deputy of the Třešť municipality.

References 

KDU-ČSL MPs
Members of the Chamber of Deputies of the Czech Republic (2017–2021)
Members of the Chamber of Deputies of the Czech Republic (2013–2017)
Living people
1970 births
People from Brno
Members of the Chamber of Deputies of the Czech Republic (2021–2025)
Masaryk University alumni